Jinan University (Lebanon) is a private nonprofit institution of higher education with campuses located in the cities of Tripoli and Saïda in Lebanon.

History 

Jinan University is one of several educational institutions working under the umbrella of the Jinan Association, which operates primary schools, high schools, schools for people with special needs, and technical institutes active since year 1964.  Jinan University was established in year 1988 and received its official authorization from the Lebanese Ministry of Higher Education in year 1991.  In 1999, Jinan University was officially licensed by the Lebanese Ministry of Higher Education.

Faculties 

Jinan University has the following operating faculties and institutes:

 Faculty of Literature and Humanities (1999-)
 Faculty of Business Administration (1999-)
 Faculty of Communication (1999-)
 Faculty of Public Health (1999-)
 Faculty of Education (2010-)
 Faculty of Sciences (2012-)
 Political Science Institute (2015-)

List of Academic Agreements

Herein, is a growing list of universities and institutions with which Jinan University has signed cooperative agreements:

 Ajman University for Scientific and Technological Studies (UAE)
 Bilingual and Trilingual Secretariat School, Lille (France)
 Higher School of Commerce, Compiègne (France)
 Chamber of Commerce and Industry (Tripoli- Lebanon)
 Higher Institute of Banking Studies (Sudan)
 Higher School of Translators, Interpreters and External Commerce Cadres (France)
 Islamic Hospital of Tripoli- Lebanon
 International Islamic University (Malaysia)
 Lebanese University (Beirut- Lebanon)
 London Institute of Technology and Research (U.K.)
 Om Dourman Islamic University (Sudan)
 University of New Brunswick Saint-John (Canada)
 University of the Qur’an and Islamic Studies (Sudan)
 University of Science and Technology, Sana'a (Yemen)
 Teheran University (Iran)
 Helwan University (Egypt)
 Jerash University (Jordan)
 Mogadishu University (Somalia)
 Russian Islamic University (Russia)
 Kuban State Technological University (Russia)
 Luminère University Lyon2 (Lyon - France)
 Lebanese Army Headquarters (Lebanon)
 Municipality of Tripoli
 Alexandria University (Egypt)
 Hammoud Hospital (University Medical Center) (Lebanon)
 Mazloum Hospital (Convention nْ 2 in Management Field)
 Mazloum Hospital (Nursing Education Partnership Program) (Lebanon)
 Albert Haykal Hospital (Nursing Education Partnership Program)
 Saydet Zgharta Hospital (Public Health Research Partnership Program)
 Orange-Nassau Hospital (Management and Nursing Education Partnership Program)
 AlZahraa Hospital (Nursing Education Partnership Program)
 Holy Spirit University of Kaslik (Professional Standards Framework for Excellence in Teaching and Learning in Lebanese Universities; co-funded by the Erasmus+ Programme of the European Union)

Membership 

Union of Arab Universities.
Association of Islamic Universities.
Universities Association of Lebanon (UAOLB)
The Arab organization of the Registrars in the Universities of Arab Countries.
Union of Arab and European universities.
Association of communication faculties in Arab Universities.
Assembly of Registrars in Lebanese Private Universities.
The Agency of French-speaking Universities (AUF-Agence Universitaire de la Francophonie).

References

External links
Official website
Lebanese Higher Education 
Facebook

Universities in Lebanon